Thomas Harlackenden (1624–1689), of Maidstone and Woodchurch, Kent, was an English politician.

He was a Member (MP) of the Parliament of England for Maidstone in 1668.

References

1624 births
1689 deaths
English MPs 1661–1679
People from Maidstone
People from Woodchurch, Kent